Bau District is a district of Tailevu Province, Fiji. It is coextensive with Bau Island, the traditional fiefdom of the Vunivalu of Bau, generally considered the most senior chiefly title in Fiji.The tikina makawa of Bau consists of Bau,Dravo,Namara,Namata and Nausori. (1)

Districts of Tailevu Province

{{Fijih-geo-stub
Reference:(1).2017.Population and Housing Census.